Biernacice may refer to the following places in Poland:
Biernacice, Lower Silesian Voivodeship (south-west Poland)
Biernacice, Łódź Voivodeship (central Poland)
Biernacice, Greater Poland Voivodeship (west-central Poland)